YoungSang Ro(魯英相, March 21, 1954 ~) is a Korean theologian in the field of Christian ethics as well as a Protestant pastor of The Presbyterian Church of Korea (TongHap). He was a longtime professor and President at Honam Theological University and Seminary, and professor and dean of theological seminary at Presbyterian University & Theological Seminary. In the fall of 2017, he also assumed a professor at Baekseok University. He is considered to be one of the important theologians in Korea who was named in Marquis Who’s Who in the World, 2018. He specializes in Christian ethics, Christian culture, and Korean unification research. He has written widely on a diverse range of subjects, such as the eco-theology, Christian bioethics, the methodology of Christian social ethics, church and society, future society and future ministry, Christian study on homosexuality, biblical ethics and Christian virtue ethics. He is the leading scholar of the village ministerial movement for the Korean church. He is president of the 23rd Korean Association of Christian Studies. In 2017, he served as a co-chairman of the 500th anniversary of the Reformation. He is currently president of the Korean Church Institute of the General Assembly of the Presbyterian Church of Korea. He was named Theologian of the Year at the 8th John Calvin 500th Anniversary Project in 2018. He is the leading leader of the village pastoral movement for the Korean church.

Early life and education

Young Sang Ro was born in Seoul, Korea, on March 21, 1954. He attended both Kyungbock High School (1969–72). He earned his Bachelor of Agricultural Chemistry(presently the department of applied biochemistry) at Seoul National University. He studied Presbyterian University and Theological Seminary (M.Div., Th.M., Th.D.). The theme of his Th. D. dissertation is “A Study on the Concept of Piety in the Christian Ethical Thought of James Moody Gustafson.” Ro attended the Korean Presbyterian church, where he experienced baptism and communion.

Career 
Following his graduation from Presbyterian University & Theological Seminary, Ro had taught first at Honam Theological University & Seminary, belonging to PCK since 1982, before joining the faculty at Presbyterian University & Theological Seminary in 2000.
He had held the following status; Visiting Fellow of Columbia Theological Seminary(1991-1992). And then he was appointed as the 6th president of HTUS in 2012. He was later invited to assume a faculty position at Baekseok University in 2017. 
He was the president of Honam Theological University and Seminary from 2012 to 2016, and the president of Korean Association of Christian Studies from 2015 to 2017, and Co-chairman of Preparation Committee for 2017 Academic Conference of the 500th Anniversary of the Reformation(2017), and a president of National Theological University Council He is now the president of Thematic Research Committee in The 100th General Assembly of the Presbyterian Church of Korea, a president of Korea Culture Mission Center, and Agape (Somang Prison) Director. He is the president of Korean Association of Christian Studies in 2019.

Personal life
He married Jung Sook Han, piano music professor of Honam Theological University and Seminary, begetting one daughter, Kyung Hee (married to Jung Seo Lee), one son, Hyun Woo (married to You Ri Chae) and six grandchildren; Seo Yeon, Ji Hyun, Joon Seong, Tae Yoon, Tae Heon and Eun Seong.

Honors 
He won the General Moderator of PCK Award at the Commencement Ceremony in 1981, the Hwangjo Compliment Medal of the Republic of Korea(황조근정훈장) from Jae-in Moon, the President of Korea in 2017, the Theologian of the Year 2018 Award conferred by Calvin's 500th Birthday Memorial Society in 2018, the Proud Presbyterian of the Year 2018 Award(in the Department of Scholarship) conferred by the Council of Presbyterian Churches in Korea in 2018 and Albert Nelson Marquis Lifetime Achievement Award 2019. And his name was registered in Marquis' Who’s Who 2018 and Korean Who’s Who 2019 of YonhapNews Agency.

Books and co-authors 
 Spirit and Ethics
 Religion and Ethics
 Worship and Human Behavior
 Christianity and the Future Society
 Growing Bible Trees 
 Introduction to Christian Bioethics
 Green Spirituality
 Hermeneutical Approach to Christian Social Ethics Methodology
 Saving Rainbow in Mark's Gospel
 Christianity and Ecology
 Future Church and Future Theology
 The Seven Gates of God
 Be a Blessing
 Eternal life
 Church and Society
 Modern Theology and Christian Ethics
 Introduction to Christian Ethics
 Theology and Ethics of Modern Ecological Theologians
 What is the problem of passive euthanasia?
 Christian Answers to Homosexuality
 Church, Called Out to Serve the World
 Jonathan Edward's Philosophical Theology
 Introduction to Christian Social Service
 21st Century Science and Faith

See also 

 Ky-Chun So 
 Seung-Goo Lee

References

External links 

 한국개신교신학과윤리

Living people
1953 births
21st-century Calvinist and Reformed Christians
South Korean Calvinist and Reformed Christians
South Korean theologians
Seoul National University alumni